Back Arrow is an original anime series that was announced on December 28, 2019 and produced by Studio VOLN. It is directed by Goro Taniguchi, written by Kazuki Nakashima, music composed by Kōhei Tanaka, and character designs by Shinobu Ohtaka and Toshiyuki Kanno. The series aired from January 9 to June 19, 2021, with the series running for two cours (seasons).

From episodes 1–12, the first opening theme is "dawn" performed by LiSA while the ending theme is  performed by Shuka Saitō. From episodes 13–24, the second opening theme is  performed by Eir Aoi while the ending theme is "United Sparrows" performed by FLOW.

Funimation licensed the series and is streaming it on its website in North America and the British Isles, in Europe through Wakanim, and in Australia and New Zealand through AnimeLab. On April 22, 2021, Funimation announced the series would receive an English dub, with the first two episodes premiering the next day.


Episode list

Notes

References

Back Arrow